A Little Suite for Christmas, A.D. 1979 is a composition for piano, written by American composer George Crumb, written in 1980. The suite is conceptually related to the Nativity frescoes of the Arena Chapel in Padua, Italy. This private chapel, painted by Giotto (finished in 1305), traces, through a series of separate panels, the lineage and conception of Jesus Christ, incidents in his life and his crucifixion and resurrection.

Parts
 The Visitation
 Berceuse for the Infant Jesu
 The Shepherd's Noël
 Adoration of the Magi
 Nativity Dance
 Canticle of the Holy Night
 Carol of the Bells

References

1980 compositions
Christmas music
Compositions for solo piano
Compositions by George Crumb